The Acher is a 53.6-kilometre-long river and right-hand tributary of the Rhine in the county of Ortenau, in the south German state of Baden-Württemberg. It flows in an northwesterly direction from the Black Forest to the Rhine, between the two rivers Rench to the south and the Oos to the north.

Geography 
The source region of the Acher lies on the northeastern mountainside of the Vogelskopf an area divided into cirques formed by the ice age. The Acher initially flows northwards, descending steeply. At its confluence with the Seebach, which joins from the north from the Mummelsee below the Hornisgrinde, it turns westwards and flows through the trough-like valley of Seebach. Here the valley reaches a depth of about 550 metres between the Hornisgrinde and the Vogelskopf. In this section the Acher is also called the Seebach, a clue that the tributary stream from the Mummelsee was originally the main headstream of the Acher, despite its somewhate lower discharge. Below the Vorderseebach the Seebach merges with the Grimmerswaldbach from the north. Here the Acher valley heads south for about a kilometre roughly to where the rugged Gottschläg valley, with its Karlsruher Grat and the waterfalls at the Edelfrauengrab above  Ottenhöfen, joins it. From the point where the Unterwasser valley joins from the south, the Acher continues in a northwesterly direction, flowing through the municipality of Kappelrodeck , to the Upper Rhine Plain, which it reaches in Achern, the largest town of the northern Ortenaukreis.

In the Rhine Plain the course of the river was made more complicated by numerous hydro-engineering measures, especially the Acher-Rench Correction between 1936 and 1967. Even in the Black Forest foothill zone above Oberachern, the Acherner Mühlbach was cut short by the Acher at a weir, which has an average discharge here of around 5 m³/s. The Acher itself - from Oberachern also called the Feldbach - then crosses the borough of Achern and is finally led to the Rhine and Rench with some of its water (high water discharge) into the Acher Flood Control Channel. Just before the flood channel and the Acher divide, the Fautenbach joins it. The originally, partially canalised river runs northwards as the Acher (Feldbach) to Greffern. Before the construction of the Rhine Side Canal (Rheinseitenkanal) it emptied into the Rhine here. The Acher is now led parallel to it to the Rhine Dyke (Rheindeich). A section of the Rhine Plain Canal used to pass under it coming from the left, being joined by the water-rich Sulzbach, the lower reaches of the Sasbach and Laufbach as well as the Acherner Mühlbach. The Rhine Plain Canal then used to empty into the Acher itself from the right. Further north the Sandbach finally joins the Altrheinzug ("Old Course of the Rhine") as the lower reaches of the Acher are called. It empties below the  Iffezheim Lock into th Rhine, a good 10 kilometres below its old confluence. From Greffern the Acher is used as a link for the different areas of the Söllingen/Greffern Polder. In order to protect the Acher even when the polder floods, in 2005 a pumping station near Greffern was brought into operation.

Protected landscape 
Under the name Oberes Achertal a protected area was created by the county council of Ortenaukreis around the municipalities of Ottenhöfen im Schwarzwald and Seebach covering 3,600 hectares. It is protected area no. 3.17.017 and was founded on 6 February 1975.

References

External links 
More information about the Acher (in German) with pictures

Bibliography 
Britannica Atlas

Rivers of Baden-Württemberg
Rivers of the Black Forest
Ortenaukreis
Rivers of Germany